The discography of Vanessa Amorosi, an Australian pop singer, consists of seven studio albums, two compilation albums and thirty-five singles. In Australia, Amorosi signed a recording contract with BMG in 1999, she was also signed with Universal from 2006 to 2012.

Amorosi's debut album The Power was released in April 2000. The album reached number one on the Australian albums chart and was certified platinum four times by the Australian Recording Industry Association (ARIA). It also went top ten in Germany where it was certified gold. The album's most successful single "Absolutely Everybody" was a top ten hit throughout Europe, reaching number seven in the United Kingdom, and remains her most successful single worldwide. In 2001, a compilation of rarities called Turn to Me was released in Australia. Her second album Change was released in Germany in November 2002, but for unknown reasons skipped an Australian release. After several years from the spotlight, Amorosi returned in 2008 with the release of her third album Somewhere in the Real World which debuted at number four in Australia and achieved gold status. The album produced Amorosi's third platinum accredited single "Perfect". Her fourth album, Hazardous was released in November 2009 which later was certified Platinum by ARIA. In November 2011, Amorosi was set to release her fifth studio album V, but the album was delayed indefinitely following the commercial under-performance of its two singles "Gossip" and "Amazing". Amorosi later left Universal Music, leaving the album shelved.

Albums

Studio albums

Unreleased albums

Compilation albums

Extended plays

Singles 

Notes

Music videos

Guest Appearances

References

External links 

Official website

Discographies of Australian artists
Pop music discographies